Jacobsoniidae are a family of tiny beetles belonging to Staphylinoidea. The larvae and adults live under bark, in plant litter, fungi, bat guano and rotten wood. There are around 28 described species in three genera:

Description
Members of this family have a small body size (0.7-2.1mm in length). Their bodies are narrow, and are four times as long as they are wide. They are often a yellowish-brown in color.

Ecology 
Members of the group have primarily been found in leaf litter or in rotting wood, but some has have also been found in fungal fruting bodies or bat guano. The biology of members of this group is essentially unknown.

Taxonomy 
Their taxonomic position has long been controversial, originally they were placed in Dermestoidea, before being considered Polyphaga incertae sedis. They were later placed in the Staphylinoidea, which is supported by characters of the wing venation as well as the morphology of the larval galea of the maxillae.

Distribution
Members of this family have been found in Alabama, Florida, South America, Central America, Polynesia, Africa, Australia, New Zealand, Europe and Asia.

Taxonomy
 Genus Sarothrias Grouvelle, 1918 (India, Southeast Asia, China, Oceania)
 Sarothrias amabilis Ślipiński & Löbl, 1995
 Sarothrias audax Ślipiński & Löbl, 1995
 Sarothrias bournei Ślipiński, 1986
 †Sarothrias cretaceus Cai et al., 2017 (Cenomanian, Burmese amber)
 Sarothrias crowsoni Löbl & Burckhardt, 1988
 Sarothrias dimerus (Heller, 1926)
 Sarothrias eximius Grouvelle, 1918
 Sarothrias fijianus Löbl & Burckhardt, 1988
 Sarothrias hygrophilus Pal, 1998
 Sarothrias indicus Dajoz, 1978
 Sarothrias lawrencei Löbl & Burckhardt, 1988
 Sarothrias morokanus Poggi, 1991
 Sarothrias pacificus Ślipiński & Löbl, 1995
 Sarothrias papuanus Ślipiński, 1986
 Sarothrias sinicus Bi & Chen, 2015
 Sarothrias songi Yin & Bi, 2018
 Genus Saphophagus Sharp, 1886 (New Zealand)
 Saphophagus minutus Sharp, 1886
 Genus Derolathrus Sharp, 1908 (Oceania, Macaronesia, North America, Mauritius, Indian subcontinent)
 †Derolathrus abyssus Yamamoto & Parker, 2017 (Cenomanian, Burmese amber)
 Derolathrus anophthalmus (Franz, 1969)
 Derolathrus atomus Sharp, 1908
 Derolathrus cavernicolus Peck, 2010
 †Derolathrus capdoliensis Tihelka et al., 2022 (Cenomanian, Charentese amber)
 Derolathrus ceylonicus (Sen Gupta, 1979)
 †Derolathrus groehni Cai et al., 2016 (Eocene, Baltic amber)
 Derolathrus insularis (Dajoz, 1973)
 Derolathrus parvulus (Rücker, 1983)
 Derolathrus sharpi Grouvelle, 1912
 Derolathrus troglophilus (Sen Gupta, 1979)

References

External links
Jacobsoniidae at Fauna Europaea

Bostrichoidea
Beetle families